Patrignone is a village in Tuscany, central Italy, administratively a frazione of the comune of Arezzo, province of Arezzo. At the time of the 2001 census its population was 425.

Patrignone is about 5 km from the city of Arezzo.

Main sights
 San Michele Arcangelo, parish church (11th century)

References 

Frazioni of the Province of Arezzo